Vágner Luiz da Silva (born September 13, 1981 in Mococa, Brazil) it is a Brazilian footballer.

Vaguinho previously played for Ponte Preta and Portuguesa in the Campeonato Brasileiro.

Vaguinho transferred to China League One side Tianjin Songjiang in January 2013.

References

External links

 

1981 births
Living people
Brazilian footballers
Brazilian expatriate footballers
Associação Atlética Ponte Preta players
Joinville Esporte Clube players
Associação Portuguesa de Desportos players
América Futebol Clube (RN) players
Pohang Steelers players
Brazilian expatriate sportspeople in South Korea
Footballers from São Paulo (state)
K League 1 players
China League One players
Tianjin Tianhai F.C. players
Expatriate footballers in South Korea
Expatriate footballers in China
Brazilian expatriate sportspeople in China
Association football midfielders
União Esporte Clube players
People from Mococa